George Borba, Giorgio Borba,(جورج بوربا, ג'ורג' בורבה. (born in 1944 in Italy ), former Israeli international footballer 
 Emilinha Borba, (born August 31, 1923, in Rio de Janeiro ; † October 3, 2005 ) was a Brazilian singer and actress
 Rivaldo Vítor Borba Ferreira (born 19 April 1972 in Paulista, Pernambuco ), commonly known as simply Rivaldo, is a Brazilian 
 Silvio Luiz Borba da Silva - Kuki (footballer)